The  is a type of traditional headdress worn by brides in Shinto wedding ceremonies in Japan.

The  is a rectangular piece of cloth, which covers the wig worn by the bride, traditionally-styled in the  style. The  is typically made of white silk, matching the bride's formal kimono outfit.

The  is said to be worn to veil the bride's "horns" of jealousy, ego and selfishness; it is also said to symbolise the bride's resolve to become a gentle and obedient wife.

See also
 Wedding

References

Japanese headgear
Headgear
Japanese words and phrases